Christmastime is a Christmas-themed EP extended play by American rock musician Bob Schneider, originally released on November 24, 2009. It was converted to a full length album and rereleased December 1st, 2017 with three additional tracks ("Jingle Bells", "As Happy As We Can Be", and "Silent Night") and a vinyl pressing.

Track listing
"Winter Wonderland"  – 2:41
"Jingle Bells"  – 4:22
"I'll Be Home for Christmas"  – 2:48 
"Christmas Time is Here"  – 4:01
"The Most Wonderful Day of the Year"  – 3:51 
"As Happy As We Can Be"  – 3:31
"Christmas (Baby Please Come Home)"  – 2:59
"White Christmas"  – 2:47
"Silent Night"  – 3:12
"Fairytale of New York"  – 3:28
"Have Yourself a Merry Little Christmas"  – 4:04

References

Bob Schneider albums
2009 EPs
2009 Christmas albums
Christmas albums by American artists
Rock Christmas albums